Zhejiang Xinhua Compassion Education Foundation was founded by Mr Wang JiaXuan in 2007.

The NGO’s main area of concern is that children in rural China often go to school with an empty stomach because they do not have the money for breakfast. This causes them to be malnourished and affects both their mental concentration and physical body growth. As education is seen as a way to improve one’s standard of living and help them to break out of the poverty trap, it is necessary for children to have enough nutrition especially when young. In an experiment conducted by Rural Education Action Project (REAP), results have shown that when kids in China are given vitamin pills, they tend to score better than their counterparts who were not given the pills. 
 
To solve that issue, Zhejiang Xinhua Compassion Education Foundation has launched a “One Child One Egg” program that ensures that schooling children get an egg a day for breakfast to provide them with the necessary nutrients for mental and physical growth. The program covers 4 main mountainous areas in China namely Guizhou, Gansu, Sichuan and Anhui.  An egg a day may look negligible to some but the nutrients contained within an egg can help boost the growth of these malnourished children. Eggs contain high amount of protein, fat, cholesterol and amino acids which are beneficial to a growing child.

The NGO has also tried to highlight to the society and world on the need for attention regarding this issue, by inviting the media to observe the program. MediaCorp Channel U is one of the media companies being invited to follow members of the NGO to transport the eggs from the farm to the school before the students can cook them for breakfast. The route to the school was uneven and it took great care to ensure that the eggs were not broken, as a broken egg meant that a child would not get his/her egg for breakfast.

References

See also 
 Health in China

Organizations established in 2007
Foundations based in China
Medical and health organizations based in China